The 2022 Richmond Kickers season was the club's 30th season of existence, their fourth season in USL League One, and their 18th season in the third tier of American soccer. The Kickers were led by third-year head coach, Darren Sawatzky. The USL League One season started on April 2 and concluded on October 15, 2022.

The Kickers had their strongest regular season showing since 2013, winning the USL League One regular season title. The Kickers finished the season with 51 total points, five clear of second place, with 14 wins, seven losses, and nine draws. Striker, Emiliano Terzaghi, for the third season, led the Kickers and USL League One in goals with 18 goals. 

Outside of USL League One, the Kickers participated in the 2022 U.S. Open Cup, and the 2022 USL League One Playoffs, for their first-place finish during the regular season. The Kickers reached the fourth round of the Open Cup, before losing to Major League Soccer expansion side, Charlotte FC. The Kickers will begin the Playoffs in the semifinal round on October 29.

Background 

The Kickers began the 2021 season in April due to the ongoing issues surrounding the COVID-19 pandemic. Most of the regular season had the Kickers routinely along the playoff line, before a six-match winning streak in September saw the club finish in fifth place, and qualify for the USL Playoffs, marking the first time since 2016 the Kickers qualified for the playoffs. In the playoffs, the Kickers were eliminated by FC Tucson in the opening round.

Striker Emiliano Terzaghi was the league's top scorer, scoring 18 goals.

Transfers

Transfers in

Transfers out

Non-competitive

Preseason exhibitions

Competitive

USL League One

Standings

Results summary

Results by matchday

Match results

USL1 Playoffs

U.S. Open Cup

References

Richmond Kickers seasons
Richmond Kickers
Richmond Kickers
Richmond Kickers
Kickers